Thomas J. Whelan may refer to:
Thomas J. Whelan (judge) (b. 1940)
Thomas J. Whelan (mayor) (1922–2002)